The 1975 US Open was a tennis tournament that took place on the outdoor clay courts at the West Side Tennis Club in Forest Hills, Queens, in New York City, United States. The tournament ran from 27 August until 7 September. It was the 95th staging of the US Open, and the fourth Grand Slam tennis event of 1975. During the final three years at the Forest Hills location, 1975-1977, the US Open was played on a green-colored Har-Tru clay surface, a surface slightly harder and faster than red clay. The switch came after player complaints about the poor state and uneven ball bounce on the grass courts in Forest Hills. The tie-break scoring system changed in this championship. Previously a sudden death point was played at 4–4 with the winner the first to 5 points. It changed to the 13 point tie-break first to 7 points or the first player to win by two clear points if the scores reached 6–6.

Seniors

Men's singles

 Manuel Orantes defeated  Jimmy Connors, 6–4, 6–3, 6–3
It was Orantes's 1st (and only) career Grand Slam title.

Women's singles

 Chris Evert defeated  Evonne Goolagong Cawley, 5–7, 6–4, 6–2
It was Evert's 4th career Grand Slam title, and her 1st US Open title.

Men's doubles

 Jimmy Connors /  Ilie Năstase defeated  Tom Okker /  Marty Riessen, 6–4, 7–6

Women's doubles 

 Margaret Court /  Virginia Wade defeated  Rosemary Casals /  Billie Jean King, 7–5, 2–6, 7–6

Mixed doubles

 Rosemary Casals /  Dick Stockton defeated  Billie Jean King /  Fred Stolle, 6‐3, 6‐7, 6‐3

Juniors

Boys' singles
 Howard Schoenfield defeated  Chris Lewis, 6–4, 6–3

Girls' singles
 Natasha Chmyreva defeated  Greer Stevens, 6–7, 6–2, 6–2

References

External links
Official US Open website

 
 

 
US Open
US Open (tennis) by year
US Open
US Open
US Open
US Open